Irmin Schmidt (born 29 May 1937) is a German keyboardist and composer, best known as a founding member of the band Can.

Biography

He started work mainly as a conductor and performed in concerts with the Bochum Symphony; the Vienna Symphony; and the Dortmund Ensemble for New Music, which he founded in 1962. During this time, he received several conducting awards. Schmidt also worked as Kapellmeister at the Theater Aachen, as docent for musical theatre and chanson at the Schauspielschule Bochum (drama school), and as concert pianist.

In 1968, Schmidt founded the experimental krautrock band Can with Holger Czukay, Michael Karoli, and Jaki Liebezeit. Schmidt served as Can's keyboardist until the group's disbandment in 1979. He participated in both reunions of Can, in 1986 and 1991.

Schmidt has scored more than 40 films and television programs, including Knife in the Head (1978) and Palermo Shooting (2008). He has recorded a few solo albums and written an opera, Gormenghast, based on Mervyn Peake's Gormenghast Trilogy. Gormenghast premiered at the Opernhaus Wuppertal in 1998. Excerpts from the work were released on Spoon Records in 1999. His wife Hildegard Schmidt has been responsible for Can's management and record label, Spoon Records, since the 1970s.

As of 2008, Schmidt lives in Southern France. His interests outside music include cooking. In 2015, he received the Ordre des Arts et des Lettres (Chevalier).

In 2018, Schmidt and British writer and editor Rob Young published a book on Can entitled All Gates Open: The Story of Can.

Discography

Solo
 Filmmusik (1980)
 Filmmusik, Vol. 2 (1981)
 Toy Planet (1981) with Bruno Spoerri
 Filmmusik, Vols. 3 & 4 (1983)
 Rote Erde (1983) soundtrack
 Musk at Dusk (1987)
 Filmmusik Vol. 5 (1989)
 Impossible Holidays (1991)
 Soundtracks 1978–1993 (1994)
 Gormenghast (2000)
 Masters of Confusion (2001) with Kumo
 Flies, Guys and Choirs (2008) DVD with Kumo
 Axolotl Eyes (2008) with Kumo
 Palermo Shooting (2008) soundtrack
 Filmmusik Anthology, Volume 4 & 5 (2009)
 Villa Wunderbar (2013), 2-CD compilation, sleeve notes by Wim Wenders
 Filmmusik Anthology Volume 6 (2015)
 5 Klavierstücke (2018)
 Nocturne (Live at Huddersfield Contemporary Music Festival) (2020)

With Can

Bibliography

Videography
Romantic Warriors IV: Krautrock (2019)

References

External links

The Official CAN / Spoon Records Website

1937 births
Living people
German keyboardists
German film score composers
Male film score composers
German male composers
Mozarteum University Salzburg alumni
Can (band) members
Musicians from Berlin
Pupils of Karlheinz Stockhausen
Chevaliers of the Ordre des Arts et des Lettres
German anarchists